Psydrax micans is a species of flowering plant in the family Rubiaceae . It is found in Mozambique and Tanzania.

References

micans
Vulnerable plants
Taxonomy articles created by Polbot
Taxa named by Diane Mary Bridson